Tom LaPille (born August 27, 1985) is a former Magic: The Gathering developer at Wizards of the Coast. He led the development on Magic 2012, Dark Ascension, and Masters Edition III, Modern Masters 2015, and Eternal Masters. He also wrote the Dailymtg.com Development column Latest Developments for nearly four years.  Mark Rosewater considers him part of the fifth generation of Magic designers.

Biography
Lapille grew up in Ohio, where he attended Ohio State University.

Career

Magic: The Gathering
Tom LaPille played Magic: The Gathering professionally throughout his time in college, making top 8 at Grand Prix Charlotte in 2005 and playing in four Pro Tours.

In 2007, Tom created the website http://playmagicwith.tomlapille.com with the stated goal of obtaining a job with Wizards of the Coast, the company which makes Magic: The Gathering within one year. The website and its extensive focus on the "Cube" format garnered Wizards' attention, eventually leading to his hiring within a year. Tom believes that showing Wizards how he could construct a set through his Cube design was crucial for obtaining the job, stating, "Carefully crafting a cube means taking cards as given and using them to build a coherent and fun play experience so it's about as close as you can get to actual Magic development without being able to adjust the actual cards."

While employed at  Wizards of the Coast, Tom worked on Magic 2011, Innistrad, Masters Edition III, Masters Edition IV, New Phyrexia, Worldwake, Mirrodin Besieged, Magic 2010, Return to Ravnica, Magic 2012, and Dark Ascension.

Tom also wrote the Dailymtg.com weekly Column on Magic Development, Latest Developments, from January 9, 2009 through December 2, 2012, leaving to pursue more work on Dungeons and Dragons. He still writes Latest Developments on occasion.

References

External links
 All Tom LaPille articles on magicthegathering.com
 All Tom LaPille articles on StarCityGames.com
 Tom LaPille's Blog prior to joining Wizards of the Coast
 Tom LaPille's Magic-focused Twitter account

Magic: The Gathering
1985 births
Living people